, Kumamoto Prefecture, Japan) he is a Japanese karateka. He has a  7th.Dan black belt in Wadō-ryū karate and is the national trainer of the  Japan Karatedo Federation (JKF).

Life

Born and grew up in the Kumamoto Prefecture, Seiji Nishimura began karate training at the age of 15 years. In 1982, Nishimura won the WKF World Championship in Kumite.

Nishimura began to train the Japanese Karate national team after his active competition career; In 15 years as coach of the national team, he has helped numerous Karateka through his training methods and his experience to international success: for example, Manabu Takenouchi won the national championships in Kumite under Nishimura 1994.

Since 2016, Nishimura has been senior director of JKF Wadokai.

Various

Seiji Nishimura also practices the Gōjū-ryū as well as the Kushin-ryu-style in addition to Wadōkai. He himself, however, prefer the Wadō style because of its technical variety and efficiency. Nishimura teaches in his own Dojo as well as at the Fukuoka University. He also teaches seminars throughout Japan and abroad; He is a regular guest at the annual karate summer camp in Ravensburg and the biggest karate summer camp in Austria in Neuhofen an der Krems.

Achievements
 1980  35th Japan National Karate Festival Tournament Gold Medal
 1981  4th World Games  70 kg Gold Medal
 1981  9th Japan Karate-do Championship   Gold Medal
 1982  6th Karate World Championships 70 kg Gold Medal
 1982 18th  Wado-kai Japan Karate-do Championship  Silver Medal
 1983  1st  Karate Open de Paris  70 kg  Gold Medal
 1983 19th Wado-kai Japan Karate-do Championship  Gold Medal
 1983  38th Japan National Karate Festival Tournament  Open division Gold Medal
 1983  5th Asian Karate Games  70 kg & Open division Gold Medals
 1983 11th  Japan Karate-do Championship Silver Medal
 1984   1st  Karate World Championships 70 kg Gold Medal
 1984  20th Wado-kai Japan Karate-do Championship Gold Medal
 1985  2nd   Karate Open de Paris  70 kg  Gold Medal
 1985  21st Wado-kai Japan Karate-do Championship Gold Medal
 1985  6th Asian Karate Games  Open division  Gold Medal
 1986  22nd  Wado-kai Japan Karate-do Championship Gold Medal
 1987  23rd  Wado-ka Japan Karate-do Championship Gold Medal
 1987  7th Asian Karate Games 70 kg Gold Medal
 1987 15th Japan Karate-do Championship Gold Medal

References

External links
  – official site
 Seiji Nishimura at Karaterec.com
 Seiji Nishimura YouTube channel at YouTube
 Seiji Nishimura at Facebook

1956 births
Living people
Japanese male karateka
Karate coaches
Sportspeople from Kumamoto Prefecture
Wadō-ryū practitioners
World Games bronze medalists
Competitors at the 1981 World Games
20th-century Japanese people
21st-century Japanese people